Aulocara is a genus of slant-faced grasshoppers in the family Acrididae. There are at least three described species in Aulocara.

Species
These three species belong to the genus Aulocara:
 Aulocara brevipenne (Bruner, 1905)
 Aulocara elliotti (Thomas, 1870) (big-headed grasshopper)
 Aulocara femoratum Scudder, 1899 (white-crossed grasshopper)

References

Further reading

External links

 

Gomphocerinae
Articles created by Qbugbot
Acrididae genera